1952 is the third album release by the band Soul-Junk. It was released in 2 parts, a CD and an LP vinyl record. Most of the lyrics are drawn directly from scripture, specifically the New International Version. The sound on the album is a fusion of rock, punk, and jazz that one critic describes as making "most of today's alternative rock sound like pure pop."

Track listing

CD

Vinyl LP
Yard Sax Leader 
All The Prophets 
Friend Lend Me Some Bread 
Strongman 
Electronix From A Puddle 
Salve For Your Eyes 
The Merchandise! 
Whatever Is 
Apocalypso 
Drink The Jacuzzi 
Yeah Fist City 
Snail Trax 
See No More Visions 
Even Now 
Kick In The Sink 
Nicodemus Song

Credits
Glen Galaxy – Guitar, Singing, Drums, Sax, Keys, Bass, Blown smoke harp, Banjo
Jon Galaxy – Bass
Brian Cantrell – Drums, Percussion, Trombone, Moog
Ron Easterbrooks – Guitar, Singing, Trumpet, Moog, Trombone, Bass, Drums
All songs without recording credits were recorded by Bill Day at Daydream Studios

References

1995 albums
Soul-Junk albums
Homestead Records albums